The conquest of the Nanda Empire under Dhana Nanda by a force under Chandragupta Maurya in the late 4th century BCE led to the establishment of the Maurya Empire. Little is known from historical sources for certain about the conflict.

Background
The story of the main figures involved and the conquest is obscure. The Nanda Empire, led by Dhana Nanda, was based in Magadha and containing many of the kingdoms in the Ganges basin.

Chandragupta was born to a Shudra woman. His ancestry was unknown. The knowledge of statecraft and warfare was taught to Chandragupta by his teacher Chanakya, who is referred to as Kautilya. Kautilya's Arthasastra was a science of politics intended to teach a wise king how to govern. Chanakya taught the young king a wide-ranging discussions on war and diplomacy. Chanakya's work included; his wish to have his king become a world conqueror, his analysis of which kingdoms are natural allies and which are inevitable enemies, his willingness to make treaties he knew he would break and retain, his doctrine of silent war or a war of assassination against an unsuspecting king, his approval of secret agents who killed enemy leaders and sowed discord among them, his views of men and women as weapons of war, his use of religion and superstition to bolster his troops and demoralize enemy soldiers, the spread of disinformation, and his humane treatment of conquered soldiers and subjects.

War
Much of what is known about the conquest comes from accounts written long after the war itself. Ancient historian, Plutarch (AD 46 – AD 120) gives an account of parts of the conquest. The conquest was fictionalized in Mudrarakshasa, a political drama in Sanskrit by Vishakadatta composed between 300 CE and 700 CE. The history is also briefly recounted in Vishnu Purana (unknown date), which emphasizes the importance of Chanakya in the destruction of the Nanda empire. In another work, Milinda Panha (dating from 100 BCE), Bhaddasala is named as a Nanda general during the conquest.

Estimates of the number of soldiers involved are based in part on ancient Roman sources. Plutarch estimates that Chandragupta's army would later number 600,000 by the time it had subdued all of India, an estimate also given by Pliny ((23 AD–79 AD)). Pliny and Plutarch also estimated the Nanda Army strength in the east as 200,000 infantry, 80,000 cavalry, 8,000 chariots, and 6,000 war elephants. These estimates were based in part of the earlier work of the Seleucid ambassador to the Maurya, Megasthenes. One 21st-century author, Suhas Chatterjee, suggests that "Chandragupta had to engage all his military strength, even Greek mercenaries from Punjab in his conquest of the Nanda king" and according to references about the conquest in the Milinda Panha "One lakh of soldiers, 10,000 elephants, 100,000 horses and 5,000 charioteers were killed in the encounter".

In Mudrarakshasa, Chandragupta was said to have first acquired Punjab, and then combined forces with Chanakya and advanced upon the Nanda Empire. Similarly, Plutarch writes that he first overthrew Alexanders Prefects in the northwest of India. P. K. Bhattacharyya concludes that the war would have consisted of gradual conquest of provinces after the initial consolidation of Magadha. In Mudrarakshasa, he laid siege to Kusumapura (or Pataliputra now Patna), the capital of Magadha, with the help of north-west frontier tribe mercenaries from areas already conquered. The siege may have begun in 320 BCE. By 312 BCE he had conquered all of north and north-west India.

In the war, Chandragupta may have allied with the King of Simhapura in Rajputana and Gajapati King of Kalinga (modern day Orissa). The prior experience of his mercenaries from the Punjab were likely important in his military success. It is also suggested that Chandragupta's campaign was laid out by using popular guerrilla tactics, as the Nanda Empire was large and had been able to wield large armies that would have been overwhelming to oppose by an upstart. The war brought an end to the Nanda Dynasty and established the Maurya Empire with Chandragupta Maurya as its leader.

Aftermath
Maurya consisted of at least four provinces at the end of Chandragupta's conquests: Avantirastra (capital: Ujjayini), Daksinapatha (capital: uncertain, perhaps Suvarnagiri), Uttarapatha (capital: Taksasila), and Pracya (capital: Pataliputra). Chanakya later became Chandragupta's prime minister.

Chandragupta eventually expanded his empire to southern India and warred with the Seleucid Empire over control over all of north western India and parts of Persia. The Maurya Empire eventually became the most extensive empire in India seen up to the date of when he abdicated.

See also 
 Magadha
 Nanda Empire
 Maurya Empire

References 

320s BC conflicts
Nanda Empire
Maurya Empire
Conflicts in India
4th century BC in India
Wars involving ancient India